A megamix is a remix containing multiple songs in rapid succession. It often features various artists. There may be only one verse or even just a brief chorus of each song used, sometimes in addition to samples of the same or other songs. It is common to use different samples to maintain and sometimes even ridicule the original. To unify the songs together smoothly, a single backing beat may be added as background throughout the megamix, although this is not a must. This backing beat is kept basic so as to simplify mixing and to not compete with the music. These mixes are usually several minutes long at minimum, going up to a half-hour or an hour, or even more sometimes.

Ultimix is known for "flashback medleys" producing at least one or two every year based on popular songs of the year. Each is about 15 minutes long, usually with at least that many songs if not more.

"Album megamixes" feature all tracks from a particular album edited and compiled into one continuous medley. The "artist megamix" is also popular, including songs spanning a musician's career, with prolific artists such as Michael Jackson having more than one, usually from different remixers. Duran Duran created a megamix single ("Burning the Ground") from their own hits for the 1990 greatest-hits album Decade: Greatest Hits. Subsequently, artists such as Madonna, Britney Spears, and Janet Jackson have also released megamixes as singles in order to promote their greatest hits albums or in the latter's case, studio album. Many megamixes are bootlegs.

Musical acts that have official megamixes

49ers
Ace of Base
Alexander O'Neal
Anastacia
Aqua
Avicii
Ayumi Hamasaki
Bananarama
Basshunter
Black Box
Bobby Brown
Bomb the Bass
Boney M
Booty Luv
Britney Spears
Caramell
Christina Aguilera
Corona
Daft Punk
Death Grips
Debbie Gibson (1 in 1988, Atlantic DM 86556, track 4)
Depeche Mode
DJ Bobo
Duran Duran
Earth, Wind & Fire
Erasure
E-Rotic
E-Type
Five
Fun Fun
Girls Aloud
Gloria Estefan
Gloria Gaynor
Grace Jones
Grandmaster Melle Mel
Heaven 17
High School Musical on Stage!
Hudson Mohawke
Insane Clown Posse
Janet Jackson
Joseph and the Amazing Technicolor Dreamcoat
Jive Bunny & The Mastermixers
Justin Timberlake has released one in Japan
Katy Perry of the six singles from her Teenage Dream album
Kim Wilde
La Bouche
Lisa "Left Eye" Lopes
Luv'
Madness
Madonna
Masterboy
Michael Jackson
Modern Talking (space Mix '98)
Paula Abdul
Pet Shop Boys, notably Disco 2
Pussycat Dolls, for all their singles tracks on their first album PCD
Roxette
Samantha Fox
Sammi Cheng
Salt n Pepa on their 1992 album, Rapped in Remixes: The Greatest Hits Remixed
Sash
Scooter
Shakira
Six
Skyhooks - "Hooked on Hooks"
Snap! - Mega Mix (Snap! song)
Spice Girls
Status Quo
Steps - "Platinum Megamix"
Tiësto
2 Unlimited
Technotronic - Megamix
Tenacious D
Tina Turner
TLC
Ultrabeat
The Village People

See also 
 Mashup
 Medley
 Music editing
 Remix

References

Remix